Supercomputing in India has a history going back to the 1980s. The Government of India created an indigenous development programme as they had difficulty purchasing foreign supercomputers.  when ranking by number of supercomputer systems in the TOP500 list, India is ranked at number 89 in the world, with the PARAM Siddhi-AI being the fastest supercomputer in India.

History

Early years
India had faced difficulties in the 1980s when trying to purchase supercomputers for academic and weather forecasting purposes. In 1986 the National Aerospace Laboratories (NAL) started the Flosolver project to develop a computer for computational fluid dynamics and aerospace engineering. The Flosolver MK1, described as a parallel processing system, started operations in December 1986.

Indigenous development programme
In 1987 the Indian Government had requested to purchase a Cray X-MP supercomputer; this request was denied by the United States government as the machine could have a dual use in weapons development. After this problem, in the same year, the Government of India decided to promote an indigenous supercomputer development programme. Multiple projects were commissioned from different groups including the Centre for Development of Advanced Computing (C-DAC), the Centre for Development of Telematics (C-DOT), the National Aerospace Laboratories (NAL), the Bhabha Atomic Research Centre (BARC), and the Advanced Numerical Research and Analysis Group (ANURAG). C-DOT created "CHIPPS": the C-DOT High-Performance Parallel Processing System. NAL had started to develop the Flosolver in 1986. BARC created the Anupam series of supercomputers. ANURAG created the PACE series of supercomputers.

C-DAC First Mission

The Centre for Development of Advanced Computing (C-DAC) was created at some point between November 1987 and August 1988. C-DAC was given an initial 3 year budget of Rs375 million to create a 1000MFLOPS (1GFLOPS) supercomputer by 1991. C-DAC unveiled the PARAM 8000 supercomputer in 1991. This was followed by the PARAM 8600 in 1992/1993. These machines demonstrated Indian technological prowess to the world and led to export success. Param 8000 was replicated and installed at ICAD Moscow in 1991 with Russian collaboration.

C-DAC Second Mission
The PARAM 8000 was considered a success for C-DAC in delivering a gigaFLOPS range parallel computer. From 1992 C-DAC undertook its "Second Mission" to deliver a 100 GFLOPS range computer by 1997/1998. The plan was to allow the computer to scale to 1 teraFLOPS. In 1993 the PARAM 9000 series of supercomputers was released, which had a peak computing power of 5 GFLOPS. In 1998 the PARAM 10000 was released; this had a sustained performance of 38 GFLOPS on the LINPACK benchmark.

C-DAC Third Mission
The C-DAC's third mission was to develop a teraFLOPS range computer. The PARAM Padma was delivered in December 2002. This was the first Indian supercomputer to feature on a list of the world's fastest supercomputers, in June 2003.

Development by other groups in the early 2000s
By the early 2000s it was noted that only ANURAG, BARC, C-DAC and NAL were continuing development of their supercomputers. NAL's Flosolver had 4 subsequent machines built in its series. At the same time ANURAG continued to develop PACE, primarily based on SPARC processors.

12th Five Year Plan
The Indian Government has proposed to commit 2.5 billion USD to supercomputing research during the 12th Five-Year Plan period (2012–2017). The project will be handled by Indian Institute of Science (IISc), Bangalore. Additionally, it was later revealed that India plans to develop a supercomputer with processing power in the exaflops range. It will be developed by C-DAC within the subsequent five years of approval.

National Supercomputing Mission

In 2015 the Ministry of Electronics and Information Technology announced a "National Supercomputing Mission" (NSM) to install 73 indigenous supercomputers throughout the country by 2022. This is a seven-year program worth $730 million (Rs. 4,500 crore). Whilst previously computer were assembled in India, the NSM aims to produce the components within the country. The NSM is being implemented by C-DAC and the Indian Institute of Science.

The aim is to create a cluster of geographically-distributed high-performance computing centers linked over a high-speed network, connecting various academic and research institutions across India. This has been dubbed the "National Knowledge Network" (NKN). The mission involves both capacity and capability machines and includes standing up three petascale supercomputers.

The first phase involved deployment of supercomputers which have 60% Indian components. The second phase machines are intended to have an Indian designed processor, with a completion date of April 2021. The third and final phase intends to deploy fully indigenous supercomputers, with an aimed speed of 45 petaFLOPS within the NKN.

By October 2020, the first assembled in India supercomputer had been installed. The NSM hopes to have the manufacturing capability for indigenous production by December 2020.

Rankings

Current TOP500
 there are 3 systems based in India on the TOP500 supercomputer list.

India's historical rank in TOP500

See also

Computers
 EKA (supercomputer)
 PARAM
 Wipro Supernova

General
 History of supercomputing
 Supercomputing in China
 Supercomputing in Europe
 Supercomputing in Japan
 TOP500

References

 
Supercomputer sites
Supercomputing
Science and technology in India
Information technology in India